The Queensland Railways A12 class locomotive was a class of 4-4-0 steam locomotives operated by the Queensland Railways.

History
Between 1882 and 1895, the Queensland Railways took delivery of 43 4-4-0 locomotives built by Baldwin Locomotive Works (18) and Evans, Anderson, Phelan & Co (25). Per Queensland Railway's classification system they were designated the A12 class, A representing they had two driving axles, and the 12 the cylinder diameter in inches.

References

Baldwin locomotives
Railway locomotives introduced in 1882
A12
3 ft 6 in gauge locomotives of Australia
4-4-0 locomotives